Maria Cláudia de Souza Santos (born October 9, 1949 in Rio de Janeiro, Brazil) is a Brazilian actress, television presenter, journalist, producer, dancer and model.

She's the niece of actor Luís Delfino. She was elected one of the most beautiful women in Brazil in the year 1978, and one of the most photographed women during the 1970s and early 1980s.

In TV he made important appearances in several soap operas such as Selva de Pedra, O Bem-Amado, O Rebu and Feijão Maravilha. But her most striking characters were Shana from the telenovela Te Contei? and Amanda of Plumas e Paetês. Without children, she is married to the philosopher, writer, journalist and Screenwriter Luiz Carlos Maciel since 1976.

She had her acting career interrupted by a vocal cord problem in the mid-1980s, from which she recovered ten years later.

Filmography

Films

Television

References

External links 

1949 births
Living people
Actresses from Rio de Janeiro (city)
Brazilian television actresses
Brazilian telenovela actresses
Brazilian film actresses
Brazilian stage actresses
Brazilian female models